The Pointe de Drône is a mountain of the Pennine Alps, located on the border between Italy and Switzerland. It lies west of the Great St. Bernard Pass.

References

External links
 Pointe de Drône on Hikr

Mountains of the Alps
Mountains of Switzerland
Mountains of Italy
Italy–Switzerland border
International mountains of Europe
Mountains of Valais
Two-thousanders of Switzerland